Holy Cross Academy may refer to:

Canada
 Holy Cross Catholic Academy, Vaughan, Ontario

Philippines
 Holy Cross Academy of Sasa, now Holy Cross College

United Kingdom
 Holy Cross Academy, Edinburgh, now St Augustine's High School

United States
 Holy Cross Academy (Florida), Miami-Dade County; closed
 Holy Cross Preparatory Academy, Burlington County, New Jersey
 Holy Cross Academy (Oneida, New York)
 Holy Cross Catholic Academy (Amarillo, Texas)

See also 
 Academy of the Holy Cross, North Bethesda, Maryland, United States